John Ryan's House, at 15 N. Helen St. in Lodge Grass, Montana, was built in 1920.  It was listed on the National Register of Historic Places in 1987.

It is a one-story bungalow style house, home of a barber who became the first mayor of Lodge Grass.

References

National Register of Historic Places in Big Horn County, Montana
Houses completed in 1920
Bungalow architecture in Montana
Houses on the National Register of Historic Places in Montana
1920 establishments in Montana
Houses in Big Horn County, Montana